The Deer Hunt (Lov na jelene) is a Yugoslav film directed by Fadil Hadžić. It was released in 1972.

Cast
Boris Dvornik - Konobar Zeljo
Silvana Armenulić - Pjevacica Seka
Ivo Serdar - Recepcionar
Aleksander Krošl (as Sandi Krošl) - Ivan Susnjar
Miha Baloh - Nacelnik milicije
Franjo Majetić - Brico
Mate Ergović - Joza Vikulic
Fabijan Šovagović - Zdravko
Sanda Langerholz - Susnjareva sestra
Zvonko Lepetić - Isljednik Andrija
Adem Čejvan - Kosta
Relja Bašić - Advokat Janjic
Ilija Ivezić - Provokator
Tonko Lonza - Doktor
Ljubo Kapor - Uhapsenik
Ivo Fici
Franjo Fruk - Zeljeznicar
Mirko Svec - Cinovnik u banci
Vinko Lisjak - Gospon Maresic
Marija Aleksić - Sankerica Marica
Velimir Keković - Milicajac
Marija Geml - Nacelnikova tajnica
Jagoda Kralj - Vikuliceva kcer
Dane Georgijevski
Tomislav Lipljin - Gost u restoranu
Dobrila Biser - Recepcionareva zenska
Ante Kraljević
Ljudevit Gerovac - Stranka kod brijaca
Ivan Lovriček
Zvonko Zungul
Lena Politeo - Stranka kod odvjetnika

References

External links

1972 films
Yugoslav drama films
Films directed by Fadil Hadžić
Films set in Yugoslavia
Films set in Croatia
Serbo-Croatian-language films
Bosnian-language films
Croatian-language films
Serbian-language films
Montenegrin-language films